Taingy is a former commune in the Yonne department in Bourgogne-Franche-Comté in north-central France. On 1 January 2017, it was merged into the new commune Les Hauts de Forterre.

See also
Communes of the Yonne department

References

Former communes of Yonne